"Next in Line" is a song by Australian progressive/alternative rock band Dead Letter Circus. It was released in November 2008 as the second single from the band's second EP Next in Line.

Track listing

Notes
 The version of the single from the iTunes Store, had an exclusive bonus track called "Inferiority Complex". This track is a remix of the song "Disconnect and Apply" from Dead Letter Circus' self-titled EP. The remix was done by Australian funk rock band Mammal and features vocals by Mammal's vocalist Ezekiel Ox.

Charts

References

2008 singles
2008 songs